Naushahro Feroze is a taluka of Naushahro Feroze District, Shaheed Benazirabad Division, Sindh, Pakistan. Its capital city is Naushahro Feroze. As of 2017, the taluka had a total population of 372,899.

Administrative divisions 
There are a total of 58 dehs (villages) under the taluka:

References

Naushahro Feroze District
Talukas of Sindh